Johann Ramaré (born 5 June 1984) is a retired French football midfielder. He is currently the assistant manager of Brest's U17 squad.

Career
Born in Rennes, Ramaré began his career with JA Mordelles and joined 1997 in the youth team of Stade Rennais. He was part of the reserve team until 2006, when he joined US Boulogne, then of the Championnat National. He has been an integral part of the club since then, wearing the number eight shirt, and helping his side to promotion to French Ligue 2. On 26 May 2010, the 25-year-old midfielder, whose contract with Boulogne had expired, signed a two-year deal with Stade Reims. His contract was not renewed at the end of this deal. On 24 July 2013, he signed a three-year deal with Stade Brestois in Ligue 2.

Ramaré retired at the end of the 2018-19 season. On 1 September 2019 Brest announced, that he had returned to the club as the assistant manager of the U17 squad.

References

External links
 

Living people
1984 births
Footballers from Rennes
Association football midfielders
French footballers
Ligue 1 players
Ligue 2 players
Championnat National players
US Boulogne players
Stade de Reims players
Stade Brestois 29 players
FC Sochaux-Montbéliard players